Mangelia asteria is an extinct species of sea snail, a marine gastropod mollusk in the family Mangeliidae.

Description
The length of the shell attains 6.2 mm, its diameter 2.4 mm.

Distribution
This extinct marine species was found in the Alum Bluff Group, Florida, USA, west of the Apalachicola River. 

This Species lived during the Miocene Epoch.

References

External links

asteria
Gastropods described in 1947